Tsai Ming-yen (born 7 January 1996) is a Taiwanese judoka. He competed at the 2016 Summer Olympics in the men's 60 kg event, in which he was eliminated in the second round by Yanislav Gerchev.

References

External links
 
 

1996 births
Living people
Taiwanese male judoka
Olympic judoka of Taiwan
Judoka at the 2016 Summer Olympics
Judoka at the 2014 Asian Games
Asian Games competitors for Chinese Taipei
21st-century Taiwanese people